In computational complexity theory, PostBQP is a complexity class consisting of all of the computational problems solvable in polynomial time on a quantum Turing machine with postselection and bounded error (in the sense that the algorithm is correct at least 2/3 of the time on all inputs).

Postselection is not considered to be a feature that a realistic computer (even a quantum one) would possess, but nevertheless postselecting machines are interesting from a theoretical perspective.

Removing either one of the two main features (quantumness, postselection) from PostBQP gives the following two complexity classes, both of which are subsets of PostBQP:
 BQP is the same as PostBQP except without postselection
 BPPpath is the same as PostBQP except that instead of quantum, the algorithm is a classical randomized algorithm (with postselection)

The addition of postselection seems to make quantum Turing machines much more powerful: Scott Aaronson proved PostBQP is equal to PP, a class which is believed to be relatively powerful, whereas BQP is not known even to contain the seemingly smaller class NP. Using similar techniques, Aaronson also proved that small changes to the laws of quantum computing would have significant effects. As specific examples, under either of the two following changes, the "new" version of BQP would equal PP:
 if we broadened the definition of 'quantum gate' to include not just unitary operations but linear operations, or

Basic properties
In order to describe some of the properties of PostBQP we fix a formal way of describing quantum postselection. Define a quantum algorithm to be a family of quantum circuits (specifically, a uniform circuit family). Explicitly, a language L is in PostBQP if there is a quantum algorithm A so that after running A on input x and measuring the two qubits P and Q,
 P = 1 with nonzero probability
 if the input x is in L then Pr[Q = 1|P = 1] ≥ 2/3
 if the input x is not in L then Pr[Q = 0|P = 1] ≥ 2/3.

One can show that allowing a single postselection step at the end of the algorithm (as described above) or allowing intermediate postselection steps during the algorithm are equivalent.

Here are three basic properties of PostBQP (which also hold for BQP via similar proofs):

 PostBQP is closed under complement. Given a language L in PostBQP and a corresponding deciding circuit family, create a new circuit family by flipping the output qubit after measurement, then the new circuit family proves the complement of L is in PostBQP.
 You can do probability amplification in PostBQP. The definition of PostBQP is not changed if we replace the 2/3 value in its definition by any other constant strictly between 1/2 and 1. As an example, given a PostBQP algorithm A with success probability 2/3, we can construct another algorithm which runs three independent copies of A, outputs a postselection bit equal to the conjunction of the three "inner" ones, and outputs an output bit equal to the majority of the three "inner" ones; the new algorithm will be correct with conditional probability , greater than the original 2/3.
 PostBQP is closed under intersection. We may assume by probability amplification that both circuit families have success probability at least 5/6.

More generally, combinations of these ideas show that PostBQP is closed under union and BQP truth-table reductions.

= 

Scott Aaronson showed that the complexity classes  (postselected bounded error quantum polynomial time) and PP (probabilistic polynomial time) are equal.

The usual definition of a  circuit family is one with two outbit qubits P (postselection) and Q (output) with a single measurement of P and Q at the end such that the probability of measuring  has nonzero probability, the conditional probability Pr[Q = 1|P = 1] ≥ 2/3 if the input x is in the language, and Pr[Q = 0|P = 1] ≥ 2/3 if the input x is not in the language. Hadamard, Toffoli) has this property whenever .

Proving  ⊆  

Suppose we are given a  family of circuits to decide a language L. We assume without loss of generality (e.g. see the inessential properties of quantum computers) that all gates have transition matrices that are represented with real numbers, at the expense of adding one more qubit.

Let  denote the final quantum state of the circuit before the postselecting measurement is made. The key insight is that the comparison of these amplitudes can be transformed into comparing the acceptance probability of a  machine with 1/2.

Matrix view of PostBQP algorithms 
Let n denote the input size,  denote the total number of qubits in the circuit (inputs, ancillary, output and postselection qubits), and  denote the total number of gates.
Represent the ith gate by its transition matrix Ai (a real unitary  matrix) and let the initial state be  (padded with zeroes). Then . Define S1 (resp.

 

 

The definition of  ensures that either  or  according to whether x is in L or not.

In order to do this, we expand the definition of matrix multiplication:
 

where the sum is taken over all lists of G basis vectors . Now  and  can be expressed as a sum of pairwise products of these terms.

Technicality: we may assume entries of the transition matrices  are rationals with denominator  for some polynomial f(n).
The definition of  tells us that  if x is in L, and that otherwise . Let us replace all entries of A by the nearest fraction with denominator  for a large polynomial  that we presently describe. What will be used later is that the new  values satisfy  if x is in L, and  if x is not in L. Using the earlier technical assumption and by analyzing how the 1-norm of the computational state changes, this is seen to be satisfied if  thus clearly there is a large enough f that is polynomial in n.

Constructing the PP machine
Now we provide the detailed implementation of our  machine. Let  denote the sequence  and define the shorthand notation
 ,
then 
 
We define our  machine to
 pick a basis state  uniformly at random
 if  then STOP and accept with probability 1/2, reject with probability 1/2
 pick two sequences  of G basis states uniformly at random
 compute  (which is a fraction with denominator  such that )
 if  then accept with probability  and reject with probability  (which takes at most  coin flips)
 otherwise (then ) accept with probability  and reject with probability  (which again takes at most  coin flips)
Then it is straightforward to compute that this machine accepts with probability

so this is a  machine for the language L, as needed.

Proving  ⊆   
Suppose we have a  machine with time complexity  on input x of length . Thus the machine flips a coin at most T times during the computation. We can thus view the machine as a deterministic function f (implemented, e.g. by a classical circuit) which takes two inputs (x, r) where r, a binary string of length T, represents the results of the random coin flips that are performed by the computation, and the output of f is 1 (accept) or 0 (reject). The definition of  tells us that 
 
Thus, we want a  algorithm that can determine whether the above statement is true.

Define s to be the number of random strings which lead to acceptance,
 
and so  is the number of rejected strings.
It is straightforward to argue that without loss of generality, ; for details, see a similar without loss of generality assumption in the proof that  is closed under complementation.

Aaronson's algorithm 
Aaronson's algorithm for solving this problem is as follows. For simplicity, we will write all quantum states as unnormalized. First, we prepare the state . Second, we apply Hadamard gates to the second register (each of the first T qubits), measure the second register and postselect on it being the all-zero string. It is easy to verify that this leaves the last register (the last qubit) in the residual state
 
Where H denotes the Hadamard gate, we compute the state
 .
 .

Visualizing the possible states of a qubit as a circle, we see that if , (i.e. if ) then  lies in the open quadrant  while if , (i.e. if ) then  lies in the open quadrant . In the rest of the proof, we make precise the idea that we can distinguish between these two quadrants.

Analysis

Overall, the  algorithm is as follows.
We do the following experiment for each : construct and measure  in the basis  a total of  times where C is a constant. If the proportion of  measurements is greater than k, then reject. If we don't reject for any i, accept. Chernoff bounds then show that for a sufficiently large universal constant C, we correctly classify x with probability at least 2/3.

Implications 

 See Quantum computation reformulation of PP

References 

Articles containing proofs
Quantum complexity theory
Probabilistic complexity classes